Peter René Cipiriano Baumann (born January 5, 1968), better known as DJ BoBo, has sold 14 million records worldwide. He has released 13 studio albums, as well as a few compilation albums which have included his previous hits in a reworked format. DJ BoBo has released as many as 34 singles to date, some of which have charted quite high, not only in German speaking countries, but also in other European territories.

As a dance music producer, his first big success came with the single "Somebody Dance with Me", which borrows its melody from Rockwell's Somebody's Watching Me. After this, he charted well with the singles "Keep on Dancing", "Take Control", "Everybody", "Let the Dream Come True", "Love Is All Around", "Freedom", "Pray" and "What a Feeling", as well as "Chihuahua", almost all of which comprised fast-paced Eurodance techno sound with female catchy refrains and rap performed by René. Between 1992 through 2007, he had 27 single chart-hits in Switzerland and Germany, and has won 10 World Music Awards for being Switzerland's best selling artist. René has received numerous Gold and Platinum certifications for his singles and albums and has found success in Europe (primarily in Germany and Switzerland), Asia and South America.

Albums

Studio albums

Compilation albums

Remix albums

Live album(s)

Singles

References

Discographies of Swiss artists